6223 Dahl, provisional designation , is a carbonaceous asteroid from the central region of the asteroid belt, approximately 18 kilometres in diameter. It was discovered on 3 September 1980, by Czech astronomer Antonín Mrkos at Kleť Observatory near České Budějovice in the Czech Republic. The asteroid was named after author of children's books, Roald Dahl.

Orbit and classification 

Dahl orbits the Sun in the central main-belt at a distance of 2.4–3.1 AU once every 4 years and 6 months (1,653 days). Its orbit has an eccentricity of 0.12 and an inclination of 4° with respect to the ecliptic. The first precovery was taken at the US Goethe Link Observatory in 1949, extending the asteroid's observation arc by 31 years prior to its discovery.

Physical characteristics 

Dahl has been characterised as a dark, carbonaceous C-type asteroid.

Lightcurves 

In November 2011, a rotational lightcurve of Dahl was obtained by Brett Waller at the Cedar Green Observatory in Virginia in the United States. It gave a rotation period of  hours with a brightness variation of 0.43 in magnitude.

Diameter and albedo 

According to the survey carried out by the NEOWISE mission of NASA's Wide-field Infrared Survey Explorer, Dahl measures 19.6 kilometres in diameter and its surface has a low albedo of 0.034, while the Collaborative Asteroid Lightcurve Link assumes a standard albedo for carbonaceous asteroids of 0.057 and calculates a diameter of 16.8 kilometres, as the higher the albedo (reflectivity), the lower a body's diameter for certain absolute magnitude.

Naming 

This minor planet was named in memory of the Welsh author Roald Dahl (1916–1990), known for his classic children's books Willy Wonka and the Chocolate Factory and James and the Giant Peach. The approved naming citation was published by the Minor Planet Center on 28 August 1996.

References

External links 
 Asteroid Lightcurve Database (LCDB), query form (info )
 Dictionary of Minor Planet Names, Google books
 Asteroids and comets rotation curves, CdR – Observatoire de Genève, Raoul Behrend
 Discovery Circumstances: Numbered Minor Planets (5001)-(10000) – Minor Planet Center
 
 

006223
Discoveries by Antonín Mrkos
Named minor planets
6223 Dahl
19800903